The following is the list of the 68 stations of the Hamburg S-Bahn transit system. The Hamburg S-Bahn is operated by S-Bahn Hamburg GmbH (S-Bahn Hamburg plc) for the Hamburger Verkehrsverbund, the company coordinating public transport in Hamburg, northern Germany.

The stations are listed in alphabetical order, with the line and the connections to other transport systems.

A

B

D

E

F

H

I

J

K

L

M

N

O

P

R

S

T

V

W

See also 
 Hamburg U-Bahn
 Hamburger Verkehrsverbund (Public transport organisation in Hamburg)

References

External links 

 S Bahn Hamburg 

Stations
!
 
Hamburg
 
Hamburg